Robert G. Newman (October 26, 1937 – August 1, 2018) was an American physician, scientist, health manager and philanthropist.

Life 
Robert Gabriel Newman was born in The Hague, Netherlands, as child of German emigrants. At that time his parents, as Jews, were on the escape from national-socialist Germany. His father, Rudolph Neumann (later Randolph Newman), and mother Eva Neumann, born Feilchenfeldt (later Eva Newman), both were legal practitioners.

The family then moved to New York City in August 1939. After the end of World War II Newman for some years lived in Frankfurt/Main, Germany, where his father, as a legal practitioner, took part in the liquidation of IG Farben.

1958 Newman received a bachelor's degree at Washington Square College of New York University, until 1963 earned an MD (medical degree) at the University of Rochester School of Medicine and Dentistry and acquired a Master of Public Health (MPH) degree at the School of Public Health University of California, Berkeley.

Professional stations e.g. were: 1967 service as physician in the US Air Force in Fukuoka, Japan, from 1970 Assistant Commissioner, Addiction Programs, New York City Department of Health, from 1976 vice president and from 1978 to 1997 president and CEO of Beth Israel Medical Center (BIMC), today Mount Sinai Beth Israel in Downtown Manhattan, New York City, 1997–2001 president and CEO of Continuum Health Partners, 2001–2013 director of Baron Edmond de Rothschild Chemical Dependency Institute of BIMC.

Between 1994 and 2012 Newman was professor each at Dept. of Epidemiology and Population Health and at Dept. of Psychiatry and Behavioral Sciences of Albert Einstein College of Medicine, New York City.

Newmans special professional, scientific and humanitarian interest was dedicated to the treatment of drug addicts, especially of heroin addicts. As early as 1968 Newman met the physicians and researchers couple Marie Nyswander and Vincent Dole, who in 1964 in New York City had begun to treat heroin addicts with methadone.

Under the director of the New York City Dept. of Health, Gordon Chase, at the term of office of New York Mayor John Lindsay, Newman became the opportunity, to introduce and expand the methadone therapy at a larger scale. This expansion was not undisputed. In 1998 New York Mayor Rudy Giuliani even intended to downsize the local methadone programs, but was not successful with this.

Worldwide, Newman was counseling numerous institutions in the introduction of methadone therapy, e.g. in Hong Kong or in Germany.  This engagement earned Newman the nickname "methadone apostle" or "methadone pope".

A motto of Newman about heroin dependency respectively methadone treatment was: "It’s a medical problem – for which a treatment exists, but for which at the moment a cure does not". Newman continuously emphasized the humanitarian aspects of dealing with the drug-dependent patients.

Newman was married to Seiko Newman, born Kusuba; they have two children. In June 2018, Newman was victim of a car accident in The Bronx, of which sequelae he finally died.

Honours and awards
 1985 Nyswander/Dole “Marie” Awards (awarded by the American Association for the Treatment of Opioid Dependence / AATOD)
 1994 Norman E. Zinberg Memorial Lecture Award for Achievement in the Field of Medicine (awarded by Cambridge Hospital and Harvard Medical School)
 1996 David E. Rogers Award (awarded by Robert Wood Johnson Foundation)
 2006 The International Rolleston Award (awarded by NGO Harm Reduction International); for an exceptional contribution to harm reduction by drug addiction 
 2014 Order of the Rising Sun (awarded by the Japanese government), for the exceptional promotion of medical academical exchange between Japan and the USA

Literature
 Robert G. Newman: Expansion of opiate agonist treatment: an historical perspective, Harm Reduction Journal 2006; 3: 20, Abstract

(For an extensive list see interview with Robert Newman 2011)

Further reading

 Robert Newman – Obituary, The New York Times, August 3, 2018 
 Dr. Robert Newman, Apostle of Methadone Treatment, Dies at 80, The New York Times, August 8, 2018 
 
 New York's ‘Methadone Pope’ fought for addiction treatment decades ahead of his time 
 2011 interview with Robert Newman

References

External links
 of BIMC

1937 births
2018 deaths
German emigrants to the United States